This is a list of lists of diplomatic missions, sorted by receiving and sending country.

Lists by received country

Africa
 List of diplomatic missions in Algeria
 List of diplomatic missions in Angola
 List of diplomatic missions in Benin
 List of diplomatic missions in Botswana
 List of diplomatic missions in Burkina Faso
 List of diplomatic missions in Burundi
 List of diplomatic missions in Cameroon
 List of diplomatic missions in Cape Verde
 List of diplomatic missions in the Central African Republic 
 List of diplomatic missions in Chad
 List of diplomatic missions in Comoros
 List of diplomatic missions in the Democratic Republic of the Congo
 List of diplomatic missions in the Republic of the Congo
 List of diplomatic missions in Djibouti
 List of diplomatic missions in Egypt
 List of diplomatic missions in Equatorial Guinea
 List of diplomatic missions in Eritrea
 List of diplomatic missions in Eswatini
 List of diplomatic missions in Ethiopia
 List of diplomatic missions in Gabon
 List of diplomatic missions in the Gambia
 List of diplomatic missions in Ghana
 List of diplomatic missions in Guinea
 List of diplomatic missions in Guinea-Bissau
 List of diplomatic missions in Ivory Coast
 List of diplomatic missions in Kenya
 List of diplomatic missions in Lesotho
 List of diplomatic missions in Liberia
 List of diplomatic missions in Libya
 List of diplomatic missions in Madagascar
 List of diplomatic missions in Malawi
 List of diplomatic missions in Mali
 List of diplomatic missions in Mauritania
 List of diplomatic missions in Mauritius
 List of diplomatic missions in Morocco
 List of diplomatic missions in Mozambique
 List of diplomatic missions in Namibia
 List of diplomatic missions in Niger
 List of diplomatic missions in Nigeria
 List of diplomatic missions in Rwanda
 List of diplomatic missions in São Tomé and Príncipe
 List of diplomatic missions in Senegal
 List of diplomatic missions in Seychelles
 List of diplomatic missions in Sierra Leone
 List of diplomatic missions in Somalia
 List of diplomatic missions in South Africa
 List of diplomatic missions in South Sudan
 List of diplomatic missions in Sudan
 List of diplomatic missions in Tanzania
 List of diplomatic missions in Togo
 List of diplomatic missions in Tunisia
 List of diplomatic missions in Uganda
 List of diplomatic missions in Zambia
 List of diplomatic missions in Zimbabwe

Limited recognition
 List of diplomatic missions in the Sahrawi Arab Democratic Republic
 List of diplomatic missions in Somaliland

Americas
 List of diplomatic missions in Antigua and Barbuda
 List of diplomatic missions in Argentina
 List of diplomatic missions in The Bahamas
 List of diplomatic missions in Barbados
 List of diplomatic missions in Belize
 List of diplomatic missions in Bolivia
 List of diplomatic missions in Brazil
 List of diplomatic missions in Canada
 List of diplomatic missions in Chile
 List of diplomatic missions in Colombia
 List of diplomatic missions in Costa Rica 
 List of diplomatic missions in Cuba
 List of diplomatic missions in Dominica
 List of diplomatic missions in the Dominican Republic
 List of diplomatic missions in Ecuador
 List of diplomatic missions in El Salvador
 List of diplomatic missions in Grenada
 List of diplomatic missions in Guatemala
 List of diplomatic missions in Guyana
 List of diplomatic missions in Haiti
 List of diplomatic missions in Honduras
 List of diplomatic missions in Jamaica
 List of diplomatic missions in Mexico
 List of diplomatic missions in Nicaragua
 List of diplomatic missions in Panama
 List of diplomatic missions in Paraguay
 List of diplomatic missions in Peru
 List of diplomatic missions in Saint Kitts and Nevis
 List of diplomatic missions in Saint Lucia
 List of diplomatic missions in Saint Vincent and the Grenadines
 List of diplomatic missions in Suriname
 List of diplomatic missions in Trinidad and Tobago
 List of diplomatic missions in the United States
 List of diplomatic missions in Uruguay
 List of diplomatic missions in Venezuela

Dependencies and other territories
 List of diplomatic missions in Greenland

Asia
 List of diplomatic missions in Afghanistan
 List of diplomatic missions in Armenia
 List of diplomatic missions in Azerbaijan
 List of diplomatic missions in Bahrain
 List of diplomatic missions in Bangladesh
 List of diplomatic missions in Bhutan
 List of diplomatic missions in Brunei
 List of diplomatic missions in Cambodia
 List of diplomatic missions in China
 List of diplomatic missions in Cyprus
 List of diplomatic missions in East Timor
 List of diplomatic missions in Egypt
 List of diplomatic missions in Georgia (country)
 List of diplomatic missions in India
 List of diplomatic missions in Indonesia
 List of diplomatic missions in Iran
 List of diplomatic missions in Iraq
 List of diplomatic missions in Israel
 List of diplomatic missions in Japan
 List of diplomatic missions in Jordan
 List of diplomatic missions in Kazakhstan
 List of diplomatic missions in North Korea
 List of diplomatic missions in South Korea
 List of diplomatic missions in Kuwait
 List of diplomatic missions in Kyrgyzstan
 List of diplomatic missions in Laos
 List of diplomatic missions in Lebanon
 List of diplomatic missions in Malaysia
 List of diplomatic missions in the Maldives
 List of diplomatic missions in Mongolia
 List of diplomatic missions in Myanmar
 List of diplomatic missions in Nepal
 List of diplomatic missions in Oman
 List of diplomatic missions in Pakistan
 List of diplomatic missions in the Philippines
 List of diplomatic missions in Qatar
 List of diplomatic missions in Russia
 List of diplomatic missions in Saudi Arabia
 List of diplomatic missions in Singapore
 List of diplomatic missions in Sri Lanka
 List of diplomatic missions in Syria
 List of diplomatic missions in Tajikistan
 List of diplomatic missions in Thailand
 List of diplomatic missions in Turkey
 List of diplomatic missions in Turkmenistan
 List of diplomatic missions in the United Arab Emirates
 List of diplomatic missions in Uzbekistan
 List of diplomatic missions in Vietnam
 List of diplomatic missions in Yemen

Limited recognition
 List of diplomatic missions in Abkhazia
 List of diplomatic missions in Northern Cyprus
 List of diplomatic missions in Palestine
 List of diplomatic missions in South Ossetia
 List of diplomatic missions in Taiwan

Dependencies and other territories
 List of diplomatic missions in Hong Kong
 List of diplomatic missions in Kurdistan Region
 List of diplomatic missions in Macau

Europe
 List of diplomatic missions in Albania
 List of diplomatic missions in Andorra
 List of diplomatic missions in Armenia
 List of diplomatic missions in Austria
 List of diplomatic missions in Azerbaijan
 List of diplomatic missions in Belarus
 List of diplomatic missions in Belgium
 List of diplomatic missions in Bosnia and Herzegovina
 List of diplomatic missions in Bulgaria
 List of diplomatic missions in Croatia
 List of diplomatic missions in Cyprus
 List of diplomatic missions in the Czech Republic
 List of diplomatic missions in Denmark
 List of diplomatic missions in Estonia
 List of diplomatic missions in Finland
 List of diplomatic missions in France
 List of diplomatic missions in Georgia (country)
 List of diplomatic missions in Germany
 List of diplomatic missions in Greece
 List of diplomatic missions in Hungary
 List of diplomatic missions in Iceland
 List of diplomatic missions in Ireland 
 List of diplomatic missions in Italy
 List of diplomatic missions in Kazakhstan
 List of diplomatic missions in Latvia
 List of diplomatic missions in Liechtenstein
 List of diplomatic missions in Lithuania
 List of diplomatic missions in Luxembourg
 List of diplomatic missions in Malta
 List of diplomatic missions in Moldova
 List of diplomatic missions in Monaco 
 List of diplomatic missions in Montenegro
 List of diplomatic missions in the Netherlands
 List of diplomatic missions in North Macedonia
 List of diplomatic missions in Norway
 List of diplomatic missions in Poland
 List of diplomatic missions in Portugal
 List of diplomatic missions in Romania
 List of diplomatic missions in Russia
 List of diplomatic missions in San Marino 
 List of diplomatic missions in Serbia
 List of diplomatic missions in Slovakia
 List of diplomatic missions in Slovenia
 List of diplomatic missions in Spain
 List of diplomatic missions in Sweden
 List of diplomatic missions in Switzerland 
 List of diplomatic missions in Turkey
 List of diplomatic missions in Ukraine
 List of diplomatic missions in the United Kingdom
 List of diplomatic missions in Vatican City

Limited recognition
 List of diplomatic missions in Abkhazia
 List of diplomatic missions in Kosovo
 List of diplomatic missions in Northern Cyprus
 List of diplomatic missions in South Ossetia
 List of diplomatic missions in Transnistria

Other entities
 List of diplomatic missions to the Sovereign Military Order of Malta

Oceania
 List of diplomatic missions in Australia
 List of diplomatic missions in the Federated States of Micronesia
 List of diplomatic missions in Fiji
 List of diplomatic missions in Kiribati
 List of diplomatic missions in the Marshall Islands
 List of diplomatic missions in Nauru
 List of diplomatic missions in New Zealand
 List of diplomatic missions in Palau
 List of diplomatic missions in Papua New Guinea
 List of diplomatic missions in Samoa
 List of diplomatic missions in Solomon Islands
 List of diplomatic missions in Tonga
 List of diplomatic missions in Tuvalu
 List of diplomatic missions in Vanuatu

Associated states of New Zealand
 List of diplomatic missions in the Cook Islands
 List of diplomatic missions in Niue

Lists by sending country

Africa
 List of diplomatic missions of Algeria
 List of diplomatic missions of Angola
 List of diplomatic missions of Benin
 List of diplomatic missions of Botswana
 List of diplomatic missions of Burkina Faso
 List of diplomatic missions of Burundi
 List of diplomatic missions of Cameroon
 List of diplomatic missions of Cape Verde
 List of diplomatic missions of the Central African Republic 
 List of diplomatic missions of Chad
 List of diplomatic missions of Comoros
 List of diplomatic missions of the Democratic Republic of the Congo
 List of diplomatic missions of the Republic of the Congo
 List of diplomatic missions of Djibouti
 List of diplomatic missions of Egypt
 List of diplomatic missions of Equatorial Guinea
 List of diplomatic missions of Eritrea
 List of diplomatic missions of Eswatini
 List of diplomatic missions of Ethiopia
 List of diplomatic missions of Gabon
 List of diplomatic missions of the Gambia
 List of diplomatic missions of Ghana
 List of diplomatic missions of Guinea
 List of diplomatic missions of Guinea-Bissau
 List of diplomatic missions of Ivory Coast
 List of diplomatic missions of Kenya
 List of diplomatic missions of Lesotho
 List of diplomatic missions of Liberia
 List of diplomatic missions of Libya
 List of diplomatic missions of Madagascar
 List of diplomatic missions of Malawi
 List of diplomatic missions of Mali
 List of diplomatic missions of Mauritania
 List of diplomatic missions of Mauritius
 List of diplomatic missions of Morocco
 List of diplomatic missions of Mozambique
 List of diplomatic missions of Namibia
 List of diplomatic missions of Niger
 List of diplomatic missions of Nigeria
 List of diplomatic missions of Rwanda
 List of diplomatic missions of São Tomé and Príncipe
 List of diplomatic missions of Senegal
 List of diplomatic missions of Seychelles
 List of diplomatic missions of Sierra Leone
 List of diplomatic missions of Somalia
 List of diplomatic missions of South Africa
 List of diplomatic missions of South Sudan
 List of diplomatic missions of Sudan
 List of diplomatic missions of Tanzania
 List of diplomatic missions of Togo
 List of diplomatic missions of Tunisia
 List of diplomatic missions of Uganda
 List of diplomatic missions of Zambia
 List of diplomatic missions of Zimbabwe

Limited recognition
 List of diplomatic missions of the Sahrawi Arab Democratic Republic
 List of representative offices of Somaliland

Americas
 List of diplomatic missions of Antigua and Barbuda
 List of diplomatic missions of Argentina
 List of diplomatic missions of the Bahamas
 List of diplomatic missions of Barbados
 List of diplomatic missions of Belize
 List of diplomatic missions of Bolivia
 List of diplomatic missions of Brazil
 List of diplomatic missions of Canada
 List of diplomatic missions of Chile
 List of diplomatic missions of Colombia
 List of diplomatic missions of Costa Rica 
 List of diplomatic missions of Cuba
 List of diplomatic missions of Dominica
 List of diplomatic missions of the Dominican Republic
 List of diplomatic missions of Ecuador
 List of diplomatic missions of El Salvador
 List of diplomatic missions of Grenada
 List of diplomatic missions of Guatemala
 List of diplomatic missions of Guyana
 List of diplomatic missions of Haiti
 List of diplomatic missions of Honduras
 List of diplomatic missions of Jamaica
 List of diplomatic missions of Mexico
 List of diplomatic missions of Nicaragua
 List of diplomatic missions of Panama
 List of diplomatic missions of Paraguay
 List of diplomatic missions of Peru
 List of diplomatic missions of Saint Kitts and Nevis
 List of diplomatic missions of Saint Lucia
 List of diplomatic missions of Saint Vincent and the Grenadines
 List of diplomatic missions of Suriname
 List of diplomatic missions of Trinidad and Tobago
 List of diplomatic missions of the United States
 List of diplomatic missions of Uruguay
 List of diplomatic missions of Venezuela

Dependencies and other territories
 Diplomatic representations of Greenland

Asia
 List of diplomatic missions of Afghanistan
 List of diplomatic missions of Armenia
 List of diplomatic missions of Azerbaijan
 List of diplomatic missions of Bahrain
 List of diplomatic missions of Bangladesh
 List of diplomatic missions of Bhutan
 List of diplomatic missions of Brunei
 List of diplomatic missions of Cambodia
 List of diplomatic missions of China
 List of diplomatic missions of Cyprus
 List of diplomatic missions of East Timor
 List of diplomatic missions of Egypt
 List of diplomatic missions of Georgia (country)
 List of diplomatic missions of India
 List of diplomatic missions of Indonesia
 List of diplomatic missions of Iran
 List of diplomatic missions of Iraq
 List of diplomatic missions of Israel
 List of diplomatic missions of Japan
 List of diplomatic missions of Jordan
 List of diplomatic missions of Kazakhstan
 List of diplomatic missions of North Korea
 List of diplomatic missions of South Korea
 List of diplomatic missions of Kuwait
 List of diplomatic missions of Kyrgyzstan
 List of diplomatic missions of Laos
 List of diplomatic missions of Lebanon
 List of diplomatic missions of Malaysia
 List of diplomatic missions of the Maldives
 List of diplomatic missions of Mongolia
 List of diplomatic missions of Myanmar
 List of diplomatic missions of Nepal
 List of diplomatic missions of Oman
 List of diplomatic missions of Pakistan
 List of diplomatic missions of the Philippines
 List of diplomatic missions of Qatar
 List of diplomatic missions of Russia
 List of diplomatic missions of Saudi Arabia
 List of diplomatic missions of Singapore
 List of diplomatic missions of Sri Lanka
 List of diplomatic missions of Syria
 List of diplomatic missions of Tajikistan
 List of diplomatic missions of Thailand
 List of diplomatic missions of Turkey
 List of diplomatic missions of Turkmenistan
 List of diplomatic missions of the United Arab Emirates
 List of diplomatic missions of Uzbekistan
 List of diplomatic missions of Vietnam
 List of diplomatic missions of Yemen

Limited recoginition
 List of diplomatic missions of Abkhazia
 List of representative offices of Artsakh
 List of diplomatic missions of Northern Cyprus
 List of diplomatic missions of Palestine
 List of diplomatic missions of South Ossetia
 List of diplomatic missions of Taiwan

Dependencies and other territories
 List of diplomatic missions of Hong Kong
 List of diplomatic missions of Kurdistan Region
 List of diplomatic missions of Macau

Europe
 List of diplomatic missions of Albania
 List of diplomatic missions of Andorra
 List of diplomatic missions of Armenia
 List of diplomatic missions of Austria
 List of diplomatic missions of Azerbaijan
 List of diplomatic missions of Belarus
 List of diplomatic missions of Belgium
 List of diplomatic missions of Bosnia and Herzegovina
 List of diplomatic missions of Bulgaria
 List of diplomatic missions of Croatia
 List of diplomatic missions of Cyprus
 List of diplomatic missions of the Czech Republic
 List of diplomatic missions of Denmark
 List of diplomatic missions of Estonia
 List of diplomatic missions of Finland
 List of diplomatic missions of France
 List of diplomatic missions of Georgia (country)
 List of diplomatic missions of Germany
 List of diplomatic missions of Greece
 List of diplomatic missions of Hungary
 List of diplomatic missions of Iceland
 List of diplomatic missions of Ireland 
 List of diplomatic missions of Italy
 List of diplomatic missions of Kazakhstan
 List of diplomatic missions of Latvia
 List of diplomatic missions of Liechtenstein
 List of diplomatic missions of Lithuania
 List of diplomatic missions of Luxembourg
 List of diplomatic missions of Malta
 List of diplomatic missions of Moldova
 List of diplomatic missions of Monaco 
 List of diplomatic missions of Montenegro
 List of diplomatic missions of the Netherlands
 List of diplomatic missions of North Macedonia
 List of diplomatic missions of Norway
 List of diplomatic missions of Poland
 List of diplomatic missions of Portugal
 List of diplomatic missions of Romania
 List of diplomatic missions of Russia
 List of diplomatic missions of San Marino 
 List of diplomatic missions of Serbia
 List of diplomatic missions of Slovakia
 List of diplomatic missions of Slovenia
 List of diplomatic missions of Spain
 List of diplomatic missions of Sweden
 List of diplomatic missions of Switzerland 
 List of diplomatic missions of Turkey
 List of diplomatic missions of Ukraine
 List of diplomatic missions of the United Kingdom
 List of diplomatic missions of Vatican City

Limited recognition
 List of diplomatic missions of Abkhazia
 List of representative offices of Artsakh
 List of diplomatic missions of Kosovo
 List of diplomatic missions of Northern Cyprus
 List of diplomatic missions of South Ossetia
 List of diplomatic missions of Transnistria

Other entities
 List of diplomatic missions of the Sovereign Military Order of Malta

Oceania
 List of diplomatic missions of Australia
 List of diplomatic missions of the Federated States of Micronesia
 List of diplomatic missions of Fiji
 List of diplomatic missions of Kiribati
 List of diplomatic missions of the Marshall Islands
 List of diplomatic missions of Nauru
 List of diplomatic missions of New Zealand
 List of diplomatic missions of Palau
 List of diplomatic missions of Papua New Guinea
 List of diplomatic missions of Samoa
 List of diplomatic missions of Solomon Islands
 List of diplomatic missions of Tonga
 List of diplomatic missions of Tuvalu
 List of diplomatic missions of Vanuatu

Associated states of New Zealand
 List of diplomatic missions of the Cook Islands
 List of diplomatic missions of Niue